Jeff Hull (born 1969) is an artist and producer from Oakland, California. He is known for creating the Oakland-based fashion line and street art campaign Oaklandish, the immersive experiences The Jejune Institute with Sara Thacher and Uriah Findley and The Latitude Society. Hull's work was the topic of the documentaries The Institute and In Bright Axiom, and was the inspiration for the television show Dispatches from Elsewhere.

Oaklandish
Oaklandish began in 2000 as a street art and viral marketing campaign designed to raise awareness about local history and culture.

Their first project was “An Oakland Love Retrospective” slide show of 130 images of the “Saints & Sinners of the Town” which was projected onto architectural landmarks downtown. Other projects included a wheatpaste street poster series, the Oakslander Lakeside Gazette independent zine, and events including the Lake Merritt Radio Regatta, the Liberation Drive-In  and games of urban capture the flag at Civic Center Plaza.

From 2003 to 2005, Hull ran the Oaklandish Gallery in Oakland's produce district with artist Senay "Refa1" Dennis. It shut in 2005 after failing to obtain permits and meet city fire codes. A split between Hull and Dennis brought the popular symbol of the "rooted" oak tree into an ownership dispute.

In 2016, the store was named the 38th fastest growing inner city business in the United States by Fortune.

The Jejune Institute
In 2008, Hull created The Jejune Institute with Sara Thacher and Uriah Findley, an alternate reality game, public art installation and immersive experience that ran in San Francisco, California from 2008 to 10 April 2011. It funded by Hull with some of the proceeds from the sale of his father Blair Hull's financial company and had operating costs "in the low six figures" during its run, including salaries and office space.

Over the course of three years, it enrolled more than 10,000 players who, responding to eccentric flyers plastered all over the city, started the game by receiving their "induction" at the fake headquarters of the Institute, located in an office building in San Francisco's Financial District.

Dispatches from Elsewhere
Hull's project The Jejune Institute was the subject of the 2013 documentary film The Institute directed by Spencer McCall. The television show Dispatches from Elsewhere created by Jason Segel is based on the documentary and Segel's experience going through Hull's project The Latitude Society.

References

Artists from Oakland, California
21st-century American male artists
1969 births
Living people
California people in fashion